Hsu Chieh-yu (also known as Connie Hsu; born 14 January 1992) is a Taiwanese tennis player.

Hsu has won six singles and 25 doubles titles on the ITF Women's Circuit. On 21 April 2014, she reached her best singles ranking of world No. 224. On 23 February 2015, she peaked at No. 114 in the WTA doubles rankings.

Hsu, born in Taiwan, moved to the United States in 2001 and represented the U.S. in her junior and college tennis career. In 2007, she debuted on the WTA Tour at the Cincinnati Masters. In 2010, she studied at the University of Pennsylvania before turning professional in the summer of 2011. However, at the Melbourne Pro Classic in April 2014, she started competing under the flag of Chinese Taipei.

ITF Circuit finals

Singles: 8 (6 titles, 2 runner–ups)

Doubles: 51 (25 titles, 26 runner–ups)

References

External links
 
 
 

1992 births
Living people
Taiwanese female tennis players
American female tennis players
Penn Quakers women's tennis players
American people of Chinese descent
American sportspeople of Taiwanese descent
American sportswomen of Chinese descent
Taiwanese-American tennis players
Tennis players at the 2014 Asian Games
Tennis players at the 2018 Asian Games
Universiade medalists in tennis
Universiade gold medalists for Chinese Taipei
Universiade silver medalists for Chinese Taipei
Sportspeople from New Taipei
Asian Games competitors for Chinese Taipei
Medalists at the 2015 Summer Universiade
Olympic tennis players of Taiwan
Tennis players at the 2020 Summer Olympics